The 1992–93 Seton Hall Pirates men's basketball team represented Seton Hall University during the 1992–93 NCAA men's college basketball season. The Pirates were led by eleventh year head coach P.J. Carlesimo.

Roster

Schedule and results

|-
!colspan=12 style=| Regular season

|-
!colspan=12 style=| Big East tournament

|-
!colspan=12 style=| NCAA Tournament

Sources

Rankings

Awards and honors
Terry Dehere – Big East Player of the Year

Players in the 1993 NBA draft

References

Seton Hall Pirates men's basketball seasons
Seton Hall
Seton Hall
Seton Hall
Seton Hall